This is a list of festival-related list articles on Wikipedia. A festival is an event ordinarily staged by a community, centering on and celebrating some unique aspect of that community and its traditions, often marked as a local or national holiday, mela, or eid. A festival is a special occasion of feasting or celebration, usually with a religious focus. Aside from religion, and sometimes folklore, another significant origin is agricultural. Food (and consequently agriculture) is so vital that many festivals are associated with harvest time. Religious commemoration and thanksgiving for good harvests are blended in events that take place in autumn such as Halloween in the northern hemisphere and Easter in the southern.

Sublists by locale

States
 List of festivals in Florida (United States)
 List of festivals in Georgia (U.S. state) (United States)
 List of festivals in Louisiana (United States)
 List of festivals in Michigan (United States)
 List of festivals in New Jersey (United States)
 List of festivals in Pennsylvania (United States)
 List of festivals in Virginia (United States)
 List of festivals of West Bengal (India)

Country

  List of festivals in Australia
  List of festivals in Bangladesh
  List of festivals in Canada
  List of festivals in Colombia
  List of festivals in Costa Rica
  List of festivals in Denmark
  List of festivals in Fiji
  List of festivals in Iran
  List of festivals in India
  List of festivals in the Isle of Man
  List of festivals in Japan
  List of festivals in Laos
  List of festivals in North Macedonia
  List of festivals in Morocco
  List of festivals in Nepal
  List of festivals in Pakistan
  List of festivals in the Philippines
  List of festivals in Portugal
  List of festivals in Romania
  List of Singapore festivals
  List of festivals in Taiwan
  List of festivals in Tunisia
  List of festivals in Turkey
  List of festivals in the United Kingdom
  List of festivals in the United States
  List of festivals in Vietnam

Continent

List of festivals in Africa
List of festivals in Asia
List of festivals in Europe
List of festivals in North America
List of festivals in Oceania
List of festivals in South America

Sublists by type or topic

Cultural, Religious, and/or Folk

The following lists are for cultural festivals by culture, with location of origin:

 List of Buddhist festivals
 List of Bohol festivals (Philippines)
 List of carnivals around the world
 List of Celtic festivals (United Kingdom)
 List of Christian music festivals (Europe)
 Cornish festivals (United Kingdom)
 List of Feria (Spain)
 List of Festival of Faiths
 List of folk festivals
 List of Hindu festivals (India and Pakistan)
 List of festivals of Maharashtrian Brahmins (India)
 List of Muslim festivals (Asia)
 List of neo-pagan festivals and events
 List of Sikh festivals (India and Pakistan)
 List of Sindhi festivals (India and Pakistan)
 Tibetan festivals (Tibet)

Seasonal

 List of winter festivals

Fairs, expositions, and shows

 List of world expositions
List of steam fairs
 List of Renaissance fairs
 List of world's fairs
 List of major trade fairs

Sporting
 List of hot air balloon festivals
 List of kite festivals

Theater, dance, and performing arts

 List of theatre festivals
 List of improvisational theater festivals
 List of opera festivals
 List of contact improvisation festivals

Flower and/or garden

List of garden festivals
List of tulip festivals
 List of dogwood festivals
 List of strawberry festivals

Music 

List of music festivals
List of music festivals by year
List of music festivals by genre
List of music festivals by region

Film and television

 List of television festivals
List of film festivals
List of architecture film festivals
List of international animation festivals
List of machinima festivals
List of regional animation festivals

Food and drink
 
List of food and drink festivals
List of food festivals in the United Kingdom
List of food festivals in Wales
List of Florida food festivals
List of Virginia food festivals
List of wine festivals
List of Sauerkraut Days celebrations
List of vegetarian festivals

See also
 List of tourist attractions worldwide
 List of lists of lists
 Outline of festivals
 Patronal festival

External links